Jacek Jasiaczek (Polish pronunciation: ; born in the 1964 is a Polish former competitive ice dancer. With Iwona Bielas, he won the 1981 Polish national title and competed at three ISU Championships. They finished 11th at the 1979 World Junior Championships in Augsburg, West Germany; 9th at the 1980 World Junior Championships in Megève, France; and 18th at the 1981 European Championships in Innsbruck, Austria.

Bielas/Jasiaczek trained at Klub Sportowy Społem in Łódź, Poland. They attended IX Liceum Ogólnokształcące im. Jarosława Dąbrowskiego in Łódź.

Competitive highlights 
With Bielas

References 

1960s births
Polish male ice dancers
Living people
Sportspeople from Łódź